José Antonio Zardón Sánchez (May 20, 1923 – March 21, 2017) was a professional baseball outfielder. Born in Havana, Cuba, he played one season in Major League Baseball for the Washington Senators in 1945. The 22-year-old rookie stood 6'0" and weighed 150 pounds.

Zardón is one of many ballplayers who only appeared in the major leagues during World War II. He made his major league debut on April 18, 1945, in a road game against the Philadelphia Athletics at Shibe Park. His season, and career, totals include 54 games played, a .290 batting average (38-for-131), 13 runs batted in, 13 runs scored, and a .374 slugging percentage. In his 43 outfield appearances he handled 106 of 109 chances successfully, and his .972 fielding percentage was just a shade below the league average.

Zardón was a member of the 1947 Havana Cubans, considered one of the top teams in minor league history. He died March 21, 2017 in Tamarac, Florida.

Notes

External links

Mexican Baseball League statistics
Venezuelan Professional Baseball League statistics

1923 births
2017 deaths
Charlotte Hornets (baseball) players
Chattanooga Lookouts players
Diablos Rojos del México players
Fayetteville Highlanders players
Havana Cubans players
Patriotas de Venezuela players
Rock Hill Chiefs players
Major League Baseball center fielders
Major League Baseball players from Cuba
Cuban expatriate baseball players in the United States
Washington Senators (1901–1960) players
Williamsport Grays players
Scranton Miners players
Tallahassee Rebels players
Tampa Smokers players
Baseball players from Havana